The Count of Anjou was the ruler of the County of Anjou, first granted by Charles the Bald in the 9th century to Robert the Strong. Ingelger and his son, Fulk the Red, were viscounts until Fulk assumed the title of Count of Anjou. The Robertians and their Capetian successors were distracted by wars with the Vikings and other concerns and were unable to recover the county until the reign of Philip II Augustus, more than 270 years later.

Ingelger's male line ended with Geoffrey II. Subsequent counts of Anjou were descended from Geoffrey's sister Ermengarde and Count Geoffrey II of Gâtinais. Their agnatic descendants, who included the Angevin kings of England, continued to hold these titles and property until the French monarchy gained control of the area. In 1360, the Count was raised to a Dukedom becoming known as Duke of Anjou, subsequently leading the Duchy of Anjou.

The title was held by Philip V of Spain before his accession in 1700. Since then, some Spanish Legitimists claimants to the French throne have borne the title even to the present day, as does a nephew of the Orléanist pretender.

Counts of Anjou

Robertian dynasty
The Robertians, or Robertian dynasty, comprised:

House of Ingelger

House of Anjou

In 1204, Anjou was lost to king Philip II of France. It was re-granted as an appanage for Louis VIII's son John, who died in 1232 at the age of thirteen, and then to Louis's youngest son, Charles, later the first Angevin king of Sicily.

Capetian dynasty

House of Anjou

In 1290, Margaret married Charles of Valois, the younger brother of king Philip IV of France. He became Count of Anjou in her right.

House of Valois

In 1328, Philip of Valois ascended the French throne and became King Philip VI. At this time, the counties of Anjou, Maine, and Valois returned to the royal domain. On 26 April 1332, Philip granted the county to his eldest son, John:

Following John's ascension to the throne as John II in 1350, the title again returned to the royal domain.

Dukes of Anjou
The dukes contributed greatly to social reform in the 1300s and 1400s.

First creation: 1360–1481 – House of Valois-Anjou

On the death of Charles IV, Anjou returned to the royal domain.

Second creation: 1515–1531 – House of Savoy

Third creation: 1566–1576 – House of Valois-Angoulême

Fourth creation: 1576–1584 – House of Valois-Angoulême

Fifth creation: 1608–1626 – House of Bourbon

Sixth creation: 1640–1660 – House of Orléans

Seventh creation: 1668–1671 – House of Bourbon

8th creation: 1672 – House of Bourbon

9th creation: 1683–1700 – House of Bourbon

10th creation: 1710–1715 – House of Bourbon

11th creation: 1730–1733 – House of Bourbon

12th creation: 1755–1795 – House of Bourbon

Dukes of Anjou without legal creation

1883–present – House of Bourbon
After the death of Henry, Count of Chambord, only the descendants of Philip V of Spain remained of the male line of Louis XIV. The most senior of these, the Carlist claimant to the Spanish throne, became the eldest of the Capetians. Some of them used the courtesy title of Duke of Anjou, as shown below:

At the death of Alfonso Carlos in 1936, the Capetian seniority passed to the exiled King of Spain, Alfonso XIII. In 1941, Infante Jaime, Duke of Segovia, succeeded his father Alfonso XIII (Alphonse I of France according to the Legitimists) as the heir male of Louis XIV and therefore as the Legitimist claimant to the French throne. He then adopted the title of Duke of Anjou.

2004–present – House of Bourbon-Orléans
On December 8, 2004, Henry, Count of Paris, Duke of France, Orléanist Pretender to the French throne, granted the title Duke of Anjou to his nephew Charles-Philippe. Because he doesn't recognize his cousin's courtesy title, in his view the title was available since 1824.

References

External links
Titles of the counts and dukes of Anjou in the 11-16th centuries from contemporary documents with bibliography

Anjou
 
 
Anjou
Anjou